Northern England devolution is the broad term used to describe the wish for devolved governmental powers that would give more autonomy to the Northern Counties (those northern parts of England in the North–South divide in the United Kingdom).

Whilst definitions of the North vary, it is commonly defined as the border with Scotland in the north, to the Midlands, or near the River Trent, in the south. This is currently defined by three governmental statistical regions: North West England, Yorkshire and the Humber, and North East England.

History

Prior to the unification of England in the 10th century, Northern England had broadly constituted the Kingdom of Northumbria, deriving from the Old English Norþan-hymbre meaning "the people or province north of the Humber".

One of the first bodies formed in modern times to address local autonomy issues and grievances was the "Council of the North" formed in 1988. This was in response to the North's concern with the taking over of York-based Rowntree by the Swiss firm, Nestlé. The original Council of the North had last met in the 17th century to deal with the chaos of the English civil war. The council met, and while it was attended by noted businessmen and politicians, little came of it and the movement soon petered out.

The more recent push for Scottish independence has had its effect on the North of England, with the 2004 North East England devolution referendum held in order to decide whether to establish a parliament for the North. This has partly been spurred on by the feeling that London and the south are culturally different to the North, with some commentary stating that the "real" English are seen as the South. There are also concerns that if Scotland was to become independent, then economic factors associated with this would negatively affect the North, with industry/investment going to Scotland with possible tax breaks. Establishing a separate country or autonomous region is seen by some as a way to stop this. Alternatively, a potential more successful focussed economic hub based around Scotland could benefit the North of England, as their population centre is closer to it than to London. To some, the differences between London and Scotland are similar to the differences between London and the North of England.

Economically, North Eastern Businesses have called for greater control over the region's financial affairs. However, despite these sentiments, the 2004 referendum for more autonomy was convincingly rejected, with a voter turnout of 45%. 2015 saw a petition for part of the North to secede and join Scotland gain 28,000 signatures.

Contemporary movement

In 2014, the people within the North of England indicated in a survey by the BBC that there was a greater wish for devolution of some powers at least. The survey indicated that 85% of people in the North wanted control of policing, taxation and education handed over to the region. There is also a perceived continuing widening of the North-South divide, which continues to highlight the issue to people living in the North. Government policy relating to the COVID-19 pandemic also created tension between the North and the UK Government, which gave rise to some discussion of a separate region as a way of giving more say to the area.

Various parties have been formed to test the issues in elections, including the North East Party in 2014 and the Northern Party in 2015. The Yorkshire Party looks specifically at the issue of a devolved assembly for Yorkshire.

A smaller movement exists in Liverpool. An estimated three-quarters of Liverpudlians have Irish ancestry, causing some to identify more strongly as Scouse or Irish than English. In 1885, the historic constituency Liverpool Scotland elected an Irish Nationalist, T. P. O'Connor, as their MP, and 59% voted remain in the 2016 EU referendum. #ScouseNotEnglish trended on Twitter following the result of the 2019 general election as Merseyside constituencies had some of the highest Labour vote shares in the country.

In 2020 a new party, the Northern Independence Party (NIP) was formed on making the North of England independent of the South, much like the SNP seeks an independent Scotland. The NIP was formed in order to contest the 2024 general election, its goal being to establish an independent country in the North of England, based on historic Northumbria. While the NIP have nominated York as a proposed capital of an independent Northern England, Manchester and Liverpool have also been raised as options.

Regional devolution 

As well as devolution to the North of England as a whole, there have also been proposals for devolution to regions within the North.

Yorkshire 

Due both to its size and regional identity, there has existed a Yorkshire Devolution movement, promoting a regionalist form of government for Yorkshire. In 2014, the Yorkshire First Party, later rebranded as the Yorkshire Party, was founded. In recent years, some devolved institutions have been set up in parts of Yorkshire, but none exist across the whole region.

Currently South Yorkshire and West Yorkshire both have devolved Combined Authorities, with the Sheffield City Region and West Yorkshire Combined Authorities set up in 2014, as well as the Tees Valley Combined Authority covering parts of North Yorkshire. There has also been a campaign for a single "One Yorkshire" Combined Authority and elected Mayor, covering the entirety of Yorkshire. This was supported eighteen of the twenty two Yorkshire local authorities, as well as Dan Jarvis, Mayor of the Sheffield City Region; Sheffield and Rotherham councils preferred the South Yorkshire alternative, whilst several North Yorkshire councils were already part of the Tees Valley Combined Authority. A proposal was submitted to the government in March 2018, but was rejected by the government in February 2019. Subsequent to the rejection of the One Yorkshire Combined Authority, despite support continuing for it, new proposals have been made for an East Yorkshire and North Yorkshire Combined Authority.

North East England 

North East England was offered a referendum on devolution in 2004, however, voters rejected the proposal by a margin of 77.9% to 22.1%, on a turnout of 48%.
More recently, the issue of North East devolution has resurfaced with the establishment of the North East Party in 2014. The party, which is commonly viewed as a sister party of the Yorkshire party, campaigns for a devolved regional government in the North East with powers comparable to those of the nations of Scotland, Wales and Northern Ireland and has gained four elected councillors on Durham County Council.

See also 
 English devolution
 Federalism in the United Kingdom
 North East Party
 Northern Independence Party

References 

Independence
divide UK
divide UK
Devolution in the United Kingdom